Anthony Joseph Jaros (February 22, 1920 – April 22, 1995) was an American professional basketball player who won two championships with the Minneapolis Lakers, one in the Basketball Association of America (BAA) and one in the newly-formed National Basketball Association (NBA).

A 6'3" (1.90 m) forward/guard from the University of Minnesota, Jaros played four seasons (1946–1947; 1948–1951) in the Basketball Association of America/National Basketball Association as a member of the Chicago Stags and Minneapolis Lakers.  He averaged 5.4 points per game in his BAA/NBA career and won two league championships with the Lakers. He also spent one season in the National Basketball League with the Lakers (1947–1948), winning the NBL title that season.

Jaros went to Edison High School in Northeast Minneapolis, and later owned a well-known bar in that neighborhood that bears his name to this day. Tony Jaros' River Garden bar is home of the "Greenie" a very strong lime-flavored drink made with vodka. The bar has several photos of Jaros, as well as one of his last NBA Pension checks, framed on the wall.

BAA/NBA career statistics

Regular season

Playoffs

External links

1920 births
1995 deaths
All-American college men's basketball players
American men's basketball players
Basketball players from Minneapolis
Chicago Stags players
Minnesota Golden Gophers men's basketball players
Minneapolis Lakers players
Shooting guards
Small forwards
Edison High School (Minnesota) alumni